Alfio Molina (born April 20, 1948) is a former Swiss ice hockey player who played for HC Lugano at National League A. He also represented the Switzerland men's national ice hockey team at the 1972 and 1976 Olympics.

References

External links

1948 births
Living people
HC Lugano players
Ice hockey players at the 1972 Winter Olympics
Ice hockey players at the 1976 Winter Olympics
Olympic ice hockey players of Switzerland
Swiss ice hockey goaltenders